The Boundary Peak Wilderness is a protected wilderness area in the White Mountains of Esmeralda County, in the western section of the state of Nevada in the western United States.

The wilderness covers an area of approximately 10,000 acres (40 km²), and is administered by the Inyo National Forest. Boundary Peak, the highest point in Nevada, is the namesake and within the Boundary Peak Wilderness.

External links 
 NevadaWilderness.org: Boundary Peak Wilderness

Wilderness areas of Nevada
Inyo National Forest
White Mountains (California)
Protected areas of Esmeralda County, Nevada
Protected areas of the Great Basin
IUCN Category Ib